This article is about the 2007 season of the Widnes Vikings.

National League One table

Players

League results

Northern Rail Cup Results

Challenge Cup Results

References

Widnes Vikings seasons
Widnes Vikings season
2007 in English rugby league